Vernon Walter Riddick (January 1, 1917–March 12, 1979), nicknamed "Big Six", was an American Negro league infielder.

A native of Elizabeth City, North Carolina, Riddick made his Negro leagues debut in 1939 with the Newark Eagles, and played again for Newark in 1941. He died in Norfolk, Virginia in 1979 at age 62.

References

External links
 and Seamheads

1917 births
1979 deaths
Newark Eagles players
Baseball players from North Carolina
People from Elizabeth City, North Carolina
20th-century African-American sportspeople
Baseball infielders